Ubiquitin-conjugating enzyme E2 variant 2 is a protein that in humans is encoded by the UBE2V2 gene. Ubiquitin-conjugating enzyme E2 variant proteins constitute a distinct subfamily within the E2 protein family.

Structure 

UBE2V2 has sequence similarity to other ubiquitin-conjugating enzymes but lack the conserved cysteine residue that is critical for the catalytic activity of E2s. The protein encoded by this gene also shares homology with ubiquitin-conjugating enzyme E2 variant 1 and yeast MMS2 gene product.

Function 

UBE2V2 has also been implicated as an intracellular sensor of reactive electrophilic species, which are present in high levels during periods of pathogenic and/or environmental stress. The C69 residue of UBE2V2 is capable of binding with various RES. It has been shown that binding of RES to UBE2V2 promotes UBE2V2-mediated activation of Ube2N, another E2 protein that complexes with UBE2V2. Activated Ube2N has been shown to play a major role in promoting DNA-damage responses. Thus, UBE2V2 may promote genome integrity by directly sensing RES and effecting DNA damage responses. It may also be involved in the differentiation of monocytes and enterocytes.

Interactions 

UBE2V2 has been shown to interact with HLTF. Although UBE2V2 itself lacks ubiquitin-conjugating activity, it can interact with different Ubiquitin-conjugating enzymes to facilitate their catalytic activities. For instance, UBE2V2 can complex with UBE2N to form a heterodimer capable of synthesizing Lys-63 linked polyubiquitin chains. UBE2V2 may facilitate UBE2N activity by coordinating UBE2N's positioning to promote ubiquitin chain formation specifically at Lys-63, as the ubiquitin molecule has multiple potential Lysine binding sites. Similarly, it has been shown that UBE2V2 interact with the ubiquitin-conjugating enzyme, Ubc13, to induce Ubc13 to adopt an active conformation that can create Lys-63 polyubiquitin chains on various substrates.

Addition of Lys-63 polyubiquitin chains to intracellular targets is distinct from the canonical Lys-48 polyubiquitin chains in that Lys-63 chains do not mediate proteasomal degradation of its substrate. Although their function remains poorly characterized, Lys-63 chains have been shown to regulate signaling pathways by either activating or inhibiting its target protein function. For example, TRIM5alpha restriction of retroviral reverse-transcription is dependent on UBE2V2/UBE2N-mediated poly-ubiquitination. UBE2V2 has been shown to regulate TRIM21 antiviral activity in an analogous manner.

References

Further reading